Kwesi Abotsia Dickson  (7 July 1929 – 28 October 2005) was a Ghanaian Christian theologian. He was the seventh President of the Methodist Church Ghana and a professor at the University of Ghana, Legon.

Early life and education
Kwesi Dickson was born at Saltpond in the Central Region of Ghana. He was educated at the Mfantsipim School at Cape Coast. He completed his basic ministerial training at the Trinity Theological Seminary (then Trinity College in Kumasi) in 1951. He then attended the University of Ghana, then the University College of the Gold Coast. Next he went to the United Kingdom where his postgraduate education was at Mansfield College, Oxford at Oxford University.

Career
Dickson was ordained into the ministry of the Methodist Church of Ghana at the British Methodist Conference of 1957. He served in various capacities at the University of Ghana over three decades until 1989. He has been the Head of the Department for the Study of Religions, Dean of the Faculty of Arts, Master of Commonwealth Hall, the first Dean of Students and the Director of the Institute of African Studies. when he was succeeded by Kwame Arhin.

At various times, he served as adjunct professor of Old Testament and Hebrew at the Trinity Theological Seminary, Legon. He was also a fellow of the Ghana Academy of Arts and Sciences. He was its president on two occasions. He also worked at the University of Swaziland as a visiting professor.

In 1989, he was elected as President of the Methodist Church Ghana. He served two consecutive 4 year terms ending in 1997. He has served as Chairman of the Christian Council of Ghana and as All Africa Conference of Churches President of the All African Council of Churches.

Hobbies
He loved tennis and music and was a good pianist.

Family
He was married with four children.

Death
Dickson died at the Korle Bu Teaching Hospital, Accra after a short illness. His funeral and burial were attended by many notable Ghanaian citizens including John Agyekum Kufuor who was President of Ghana at the time and John Atta Mills who was a colleague at the University of Ghana and was to become the next Ghanaian president.

Publications
Kwesi Dickson has many publications to his name. He has authoritative works such as Theology in Africa and others on Religious exclusivism. Some of his texts were also used for GCE Ordinary Level and GCE Advanced Level curricula. Some of his works include the following:

See also
Alan Stewart Duthie
Gilbert Ansre

References

External links and sources
AASRBulletin

1929 births
2005 deaths
Alumni of University of London Worldwide
Alumni of the University of London
Alumni of Mansfield College, Oxford
Mfantsipim School alumni
University of Ghana alumni
Ghanaian theologians
Academic staff of the University of Ghana
Ghanaian clergy
Ghanaian Methodists
Ghanaian religious leaders
Fellows of the Ghana Academy of Arts and Sciences